Vera Galushka-Duyunova (April 11, 1945 – March 2, 2012) was a Soviet volleyball player in 1966–74. She was a major player to help Soviet Union women's national volleyball team to dominate the World in late 1960s to early 1970s by winning 1968 Mexico City Olympic Games, 1970 FIVB Women's World Championship, 1972 Munich Olympic Games and 1973 FIVB Women's World Cup in row. She played for Spartak Tashkent.

References 

1945 births
2012 deaths
Sportspeople from Krasnodar
Sportspeople from Tashkent
Soviet women's volleyball players
Olympic volleyball players of the Soviet Union
Volleyball players at the 1968 Summer Olympics
Volleyball players at the 1972 Summer Olympics
Olympic gold medalists for the Soviet Union
Russian women's volleyball players
Uzbekistani women's volleyball players
Olympic medalists in volleyball
Medalists at the 1972 Summer Olympics
Medalists at the 1968 Summer Olympics
Honoured Masters of Sport of the USSR